Patrick Campbell Rodger (28 November 1920 – 8 July 2002) was an Anglican bishop and ecumenist.  He was the Bishop of Manchester (1970–1978) and Bishop of Oxford (1978–1986).

He came from the Scottish Episcopal Church, having served ministries in Edinburgh (including a time as Provost of St Mary's Cathedral). He came from a prosperous middle-class family in Helensburgh, Argyll and Bute, Scotland.

Towards the end of the Second World War he served in the Royal Corps of Signals. After a brilliant undergraduate career at Christ Church, Oxford (BA 1947) he studied for ordination at Westcott House, Cambridge. After his first curacy in Edinburgh, he worked for the Student Christian Movement. From 1961 to 1966 he was a member of staff of the World Council of Churches (Executive Secretary for Faith and Order). He returned from Geneva after being nominated (but not elected) as General Secretary of the WCC. In the event the post went to the Revd Eugene Carson Blake. During his service as an Anglican Bishop he was also chair of the Churches' Unity Commission and president of the Conference of European Churches. As Bishop of Oxford he presided over the beginning of an Area scheme which delegated functions from the diocesan to his suffragan or "Area" bishops, in order to decentralise the work of the diocese. In retirement he served as an assistant bishop in the Diocese of Edinburgh. In 1989, he published Songs in a Strange Land, a devotional book on praying with the Psalms.

He was an early advocate of the ordination of women as deacons and priests.

References

1920 births
2002 deaths
People educated at Cargilfield School
People educated at Rugby School
Bishops of Manchester
Bishops of Oxford
20th-century Church of England bishops
British Army personnel of World War II
Provosts of St Mary's Cathedral, Edinburgh (Episcopal)
People from Argyll and Bute
Scottish Episcopalian clergy
Alumni of Christ Church, Oxford
Alumni of Westcott House, Cambridge
Royal Corps of Signals soldiers
20th-century Scottish Episcopalian priests